Creamed coconut, also known as coconut butter, is a coconut product made from the unsweetened dehydrated fresh pulp of a mature coconut, ground to a semi-solid white creamy paste. It is sold in the form of a hard white block which can be stored at room temperature. (Coconut oil melts at around 24°C, so in warmer weather it is a liquid paste.) The block is generally packaged in a sealed plastic pouch and some separation of the fat and the coconut flesh can be seen. In cookery, it is chopped into pieces or grated before it is added to dishes. By adding warm water it can be made into coconut milk or coconut cream substitutes. Adding water to creamed coconut in the ratio 5:2 gives coconut cream substitute, 5:1 coconut milk substitute.

Creamed coconut is added to Indian, South East Asian and Caribbean recipes to enrich curries and sauces. In the west, it is primarily used in confectionery items, desserts, ice cream, and sauces.  Creamed coconut should not be confused with the related coconut cream, which is a liquid extracted from coconut pulp but does not include the coconut pulp itself.

Creamed coconut does not contain cholesterol and is a source of fiber. It is also a good source of potassium.

Energy: 684.00 kcal
Protein: 5.30g
Carbohydrate: 21.52g
Fats: 69.08g

See also
 Coco Lopez
 Coconut cream
 Coconut milk
 Coconut oil
 Coconut water

References

Websites
 
 
 

Foods containing coconut
Food ingredients
Drink mixers